Bruno Rodriguez is an Argentine climate activist. He is leader of the Fridays for Future Movement in Argentina.

He was a delegate at the 2019 United Nations Youth Climate Summit. He worked with Partido Obrero, and Amnesty International. In 2021, he organized an open letter campaign to candidates, based on the IPCC Sixth Assessment Report.

References 

Argentine activists
Year of birth missing (living people)
Living people
Climate activists